= The Maltreated Child =

The Maltreated Child is a book about child maltreatment edited by Jan Carter and published by Priori Press in 1974.
